Joachim Blichfeld (born 17 July 1998) is a Danish professional ice hockey forward for the Växjö Lakers of the Swedish Hockey League (SHL). He was drafted by the San Jose Sharks in the seventh round, 210th overall, in the 2016 NHL Entry Draft.

Playing career
Following two seasons in the Malmö Redhawks organization, Blichfeld was selected in the seventh round (210th overall) by the San Jose Sharks in the 2016 NHL Entry Draft. He joined the Portland Winterhawks in the Western Hockey League for the 2016–17 campaign, where he recorded 28 goals and 30 assists in 58 games. On 28 December 2017, the Sharks signed Blichfeld to a three-year, entry-level contract.

Blichfeld led the WHL in scoring with 114 points in 68 games during the 2018–19 season, earning the Four Broncos Memorial Trophy as "player of the year."

Blichfeld joined the Sharks' American Hockey League (AHL) affiliate, the San Jose Barracuda, to begin the 2019–20 season. On 12 December 2019, the Sharks recalled him. He made his NHL debut that night in a 6–3 loss to the New York Rangers. Blichfeld finished the season with three scoreless appearances for the Sharks. He also had 32 points in 44 games for the Barracuda and was named to the AHL All-Star Classic.

With the 2020–21 season delayed due to the COVID-19 pandemic, the Sharks loaned Blichfeld to his hometown Frederikshavn White Hawks of the Metal Ligaen on 27 October 2020. He scored 12 points in as many games before returning to San Jose for the team's training camp. On 3 March 2021, Blichfeld delivered an illegal check to the head of Colorado Avalanche forward Nathan MacKinnon. He was removed from the contest and was given a two-game suspension the following day. He scored his first NHL goal on 24 April 2021, in a 3–6 loss to the Minnesota Wild. After the 2020–21 season, he signed a one-year contract with the Sharks.

As a pending restricted free agent from the Sharks following the  season, Blichfeld opted to return to Europe in agreeing to a two-year contract with Swedish club, Växjö Lakers of the SHL, on 8 June 2022.

Career statistics

Regular season and playoffs

International

Awards and honors

References

External links

1998 births
Living people
Danish ice hockey right wingers
Danish expatriate ice hockey people
Danish expatriate sportspeople in the United States
Expatriate ice hockey players in the United States
Frederikshavn White Hawks players
People from Frederikshavn
Portland Winterhawks players
San Jose Barracuda players
San Jose Sharks draft picks
San Jose Sharks players
Sportspeople from the North Jutland Region
Växjö Lakers players